Ortelle is a town and comune in the Italian province of Lecce in the Apulia region of south-east Italy. The 19th-century pastel painter Giuseppe Casciaro was born in Ortelle.

References

Cities and towns in Apulia
Localities of Salento